Premjibhai Ranchhoddas Assar was an Indian politician and member of the Bharatiya Jana Sangh. Assar was a member of the 2nd Lok Sabha from the Ratnagiri constituency in Maharashtra. He was of the Indian National Congress from 1929 to 1933.

References 

People from Ratnagiri district
Bharatiya Jana Sangh politicians
Indian National Congress politicians
India MPs 1957–1962
Lok Sabha members from Maharashtra
21st-century Indian politicians
Maharashtra politicians
Year of death missing